Mikeius grandawi is a species of wasp found in Australia. Species of Mikeius are thought to be associated with hosts that induce galls on Acacia and Eucalyptus species.

References

Further reading

Paretas-Martínez, Jordi, et al. "Systematics of Australian Thrasorinae (Hymenoptera, Cynipoidea, Figitidae) with descriptions of Mikeiinae, new subfamily, two new genera, and three new species." ZooKeys 108 (2011): 21.

Cynipoidea